Miguel Ruiz  may refer to:

 Miguel Ruiz (businessman) (1856–1912), Puerto Rican coffee industrialist
 Miguel Ruiz (rower) (born 1953), Mexican Olympic rower
 Miguel Ruiz (rugby union) (born 1975), Argentine rugby union footballer
 Don Miguel Ruiz (born 1952), Mexican author
 Miguel Ángel Ruiz (footballer) (born 1934), Argentine footballer, manager of Huachipato
 Miguel Ángel Ruiz García (born 1955), Spanish footballer
 Miguel Ruiz (basketball) (born 1990), Venezuelan basketball player